Sørfjorden or Sørfjord is the name of several fjords on the coast of Norway.

Agder county
Sørfjorden (Aust-Agder), arm of the Søndeledfjorden in Risør

Nordland county
Sørfjorden (Bindal), arm of the Bindalsfjorden in Bindal
Sørfjorden (Bodø), arm of the Mistfjorden in Bodø
Sørfjorden (Brønnøy), arm of the Velfjorden in Brønnøy
Sørfjorden (Gildeskål), arm of the Fugløyfjorden in Gildeskål
Sørfjorden (Hemnes), arm of the Ranfjorden in Hemnes
Sørfjorden (Rana), arm of the Sjona in Rana
Sørfjorden (Rødøy), arm of the Melfjorden in Rødøy
Sørfjorden (Sørfold), arm of the Leirfjorden in Sørfold
Sørfjorden (Tysfjord), arm of the inner Tysfjorden in Narvik and Hamarøy
Sørfjorden (Vefsn), arm of the Halsfjorden in Vefsn

Troms og Finnmark county
Sørfjorden (Gamvik), arm of the Mehamnfjorden in Gamvik
Sørfjorden (Hasvik), fjord on Stjernøya island in Hasvik
Sørfjorden (Kvænangen), arm of the Badderfjord in Kvænangen
Sørfjorden (Lebesby), arm of the Mårøfjorden in Lebesby
Sørfjorden (Loppa), arm of the Nuvsfjorden in Loppa
Sørfjorden (Sortland), arm of the Hognfjorden in Sortland
Sørfjorden (Tromsø), arm of the Kattfjorden in Tromsø

Trøndelag county
Sørfjorden (Flatanger), arm of the Svaet in Flatanger
Sørfjorden (Nærøy), arm of the Fjærangen of Folda in Nærøysund
Sørfjorden (Sør-Trøndelag), arm of the Stjørnfjorden in Indre Fosen

Vestland county
Sørfjorden (Hardanger), fjord in Hardanger
Sørfjorden (Osterøy), fjord in Osterøy

See also
Sørfjorden, Rødøy, a village in Rødøy municipality, Norway